Esme Hubbard (1880 – 12 April 1951) was a British actress of the silent era.

She was born Esme Woodbine Hubbard to British parents in Russia and died in Ealing, London in 1951 at age 71.

Select filmography
 Caste (1915)
 His Dearest Possession (1919)
 Linked by Fate (1919)
 The Amazing Quest of Mr. Ernest Bliss (1920)
 Dollars in Surrey (1921)
 Simple Simon (1922)
 Mist in the Valley (1923)

References

External links

1880 births
1951 deaths
English silent film actresses
20th-century English actresses
British expatriates in the Russian Empire